Paul J. Yahner (November 8, 1908 – August 6, 1993) was a former Democratic member of the Pennsylvania House of Representatives.

References

1908 births
1993 deaths
Democratic Party members of the Pennsylvania House of Representatives
20th-century American politicians